The Seventh Sense is the sixth studio album by Chinese singer Jane Zhang, released on July 21, 2014 by Sony Music China.

Track listing

Accolades

References

2014 albums
Jane Zhang albums